"5 in the Morning" is a single by English singer Charli XCX. It was released on 31 May 2018 by Asylum Records and Atlantic Records UK as the first installment from a series of monthly single releases.

Critical reception
Olivia Horn of Pitchfork labeled the song as fitting "comfortably within the worldview that Charli outlined on Pop 2", and named it a "victory lap since last year's Pop 2 mixtape". Alex Kazemi of Paper labeled the song as a "goth-infused afterparty aligned with the harsh emotion behind her new-wave debut album True Romance".

Music video
The music video for "5 in the Morning" was released on 27 June 2018. The video was directed by Bradley & Pablo, who previously shot her "Vroom Vroom" music video, and features XCX strutting around an empty warehouse surrounded by club lights.

Live performances
Throughout her opening acts on the Reputation Tour, XCX performed the song in every setlist. XCX also performed a live Fader session of the song uploaded in July 2018.

Track listing
 Single

 Remix EP "The Unreal Remixes"

Charts

References

2018 songs
2018 singles
Asylum Records singles
Atlantic Records singles
Warner Music Group singles
Charli XCX songs
Songs written by Charli XCX
Songs written by Jason Pebworth
Songs written by Jon Shave
Songs written by George Astasio
Song recordings produced by the Invisible Men
Songs written by Cleo Tighe
Songs written by Nat Dunn